Happonen is a Finnish-language surname. Notable people with the surname include:

 Janne Happonen (born 1984), Finnish ski jumper
 Lauri Happonen (born 1994), Finnish esports player
 Onni Happonen (1898–1930), Finnish politician and murder victim

Finnish-language surnames
Surnames of Finnish origin